This is a list of villages in Buskerud, a county of Norway. For other counties see the lists of villages in Norway.

The list excludes cities located in Buskerud.

References

External links 

Buskerud